Moorean viviparous tree snail can refer to any one of several species of mollusc:

 Partula aurantia 
 Partula exigua 
 Partula mirabilis 
 Partula mooreana 
 Partula suturalis 
 Partula taeniata 
 Partula tohiveana 
 Samoana diaphana

Animal common name disambiguation pages